The Water and Rivers Commission is a defunct agency of the Government of Western Australia. Established on 1 January 1996, it was set up under the Water and Rivers Commission Act 1995, to administer the Act and other legislation relevant to development and conservation of Western Australia's water resources.

It was eventually amalgamated with the Department of Environmental Protection and Western Australia's Keep Australia Beautiful Council to form the Department of Environment. This was later merged with the Department of Conservation and Land Management to form the Department of Environment and Conservation. Water responsibilities were split off into a separate Department of Water and in July 2017, a new Department merging environment regulatory functions with water management was formed, the Department of Water and Environmental Regulation. 

Defunct government agencies of Western Australia
1996 establishments in Australia
2006 disestablishments in Australia

References